The 1935 Victorian state election was held on 2 March 1935.

Retiring Members

United Australia
Sir Harold Luxton MLA (Caulfield)
Chester Manifold MLA (Hampden)
Millie, Lady Peacock MLA (Allandale)
Richard Toutcher MLA (Stawell and Ararat)

Legislative Assembly
Sitting members are shown in bold text. Successful candidates are highlighted in the relevant colour. Where there is possible confusion, an asterisk (*) is also used.

See also
1934 Victorian Legislative Council election

References

Psephos - Adam Carr's Election Archive

Victoria
Candidates for Victorian state elections